The Benois Madonna, otherwise known as the Madonna and Child with Flowers, is a painting by the Italian Renaissance master Leonardo da Vinci in the Hermitage Museum, Saint Petersburg. One of two Madonnas begun by Leonardo in October 1478, it was completed  1478–1480; the other was the Madonna of the Carnation, now in the Alte Pinakothek, Munich.

History 
It is likely that the Benois Madonna was the first work painted by Leonardo independently from his master Andrea del Verrocchio. Two of Leonardo's preliminary sketches for this work are in the British Museum, although the painting was probably overpainted by other hands. The preliminary sketches and the painting itself suggest that Leonardo was concentrating on the idea of sight and perspective. The child is thought to be guiding his mother's hands into his central vision.

The Benois Madonna has proved to be one of Leonardo's most popular works. It was extensively copied by young painters, including Raphael in his Madonna of the Pinks in the National Gallery, London.

For centuries, the painting was presumed to have been lost. It had in fact been acquired in Italy by the Russian artillery general and art connoisseur  (1751–1821) in the 1790s. 
Upon Korsakov's death, his son sold it for the sum of 1,400 roubles to the Astrakhan fishing merchant Alexander Petrovich Sapozhnikov, who had his own art gallery; it was then passed on to his wealthy philanthropist son Alexander Alexendrovich Sapozhnikov (1827–1887). Finally, when his daughter Maria Sapozhnikova (1858–1938) married the architect Leon Benois (1856–1928), the painting became part of the inheritance of the Benois family. 

In 1909, the painting was sensationally exhibited in Saint Petersburg as part of the Benois collection. In 1912, the Benois family considered selling the painting and requested an appraisal from the London art dealer Joseph Duveen, who gave an evaluation of 500,000 francs. The art historian Bernard Berenson made disparaging comments about the painting, raising doubts about its authenticity:

Despite these wrangles about attribution, however, the Benois Madonna was eventually sold to the Imperial Hermitage Museum in 1914. The purchase was made by Ernst Friedrich von Liphart, then curator of paintings at the Hermitage, who identified da Vinci as the artist. The payments were made in installments, continuing even after the 1917 October Revolution.

Since 1914 the painting has been exhibited in the Hermitage Museum, Saint Petersburg.

Description and interpretation 

This small painting shows a dark room with the Virgin seated on a bench with her Child outstretched on her lap. Her young rounded face is lively; she is clothed in an olive and brown raiment, with brown and blue drapery covering her knees. The amply proportioned Christ Child grasps a cruciform sprig of flowers which the Virgin is holding. The faces of the vividly coloured figures are crowned with delicately gilded haloes. In an otherwise dark interior, a double-arched aperture gives a glimpse on to pale blue skies.

In Renaissance Florence, artistic portrayals of the Madonna often used Christian symbolism to suggest foreknowledge of the Crucifixion — for example, the goldfinch plucking Christ's thorns from his crown. For the Benois Madonna, the symbol is a flowering sprig, in the form of a crucifix, held by the Virgin. As  suggests, in the Benois Madonna Leonardo attempted to rationalize between the mysteries of 'sight' and 'insight': "The child of the Benois Madonna has still not responded to the distinctly cruciform shape of the flower [...] because he cannot see it clearly. Once that happens, the child's hazy curiosity could [...] lead to foresight of his sacrifice". Notwithstanding its solemn motif, the painting represents one of the "most joyous and youthful depiction of Mary in Renaissance art ... she seems to be speaking or laughing, playfully engaged with her child, her radiant vitality accentuated through Leonardo’s deliberate complications of posture and drapery".

See also
 Marian art in the Catholic Church

References
Footnotes

Citations

Madonna, Benois
Benois
Madonna, Benois
Benois Madonna, The
Nude art